Lampasas High School or LHS is a public high school located in the city of Lampasas, Texas, United States and classified as a 4A school by the University Interscholastic League (UIL). It is a part of the Lampasas Independent School District located in south central Lampasas County.   In 2015, the school was rated "Met Standard" by the Texas Education Agency.

Fine Arts
Lampasas High School has found great success in their Fine Arts Department. Students can participate in 
UIL (One-Act Play), Band, Art, and Dance.

In 2013, the Lampasas Speech and Debate Team received the award of top Speech Team in the state, conference AAA. The members earning points towards the championship were Emily Kleinburg, earning 9 points through her 3rd-place finish in Lincoln Douglas Debate as well as 8 points through her fourth-place finish in Persuasive Extemporaneous Speaking. Also with Brenden Dimmig, and his second-place finish in Informative Extemporaneous Speaking earning 12 points.  Finally, the team of Brenden Dimmig and Tiffani Walthrop, with their second-place finish in the Cross examination debate tournament earning 16 points.

Athletics
The Lampasas Badgers compete in these sports - 

Baseball
Basketball
Cross Country
Football
Golf
Powerlifting
Soccer
Softball
Tennis
Track and Field
Volleyball

State titles
Girls Golf - 
1951(1A), 1952(1A)
Boys Track - 
1976(3A)

State Finalist
Girls Golf
2011(3A)
Tennis
2011(3A)

Notable alumni
Johnny Lam Jones - Olympic Gold Medalist sprinter and former University of Texas star and the number two overall selection in the NFL Draft was a 1976 graduate of Lampasas.
Keith Null - Former St. Louis Rams Quarterback was a 2003 graduate of Lampasas High School.
Al Witcher - African American; football player

References

External links
Lampasas ISD
LHS Theatre

Schools in Lampasas County, Texas
Public high schools in Texas